Caspar Wistar Bell (February 2, 1819 – October 27, 1898) was a prominent Confederate politician. He was born in Prince Edward County, Virginia, and later moved to Missouri. He represented the state in the Provisional Confederate Congress and the First Confederate Congress.

External links
 "Bell", The Political Graveyard, http://politicalgraveyard.com/bio/bell.html, accessed December 15, 2011.

Members of the Confederate House of Representatives from Missouri
Deputies and delegates to the Provisional Congress of the Confederate States
1819 births
1898 deaths